Egra Assembly constituency is an assembly constituency in Purba Medinipur district in the Indian state of West Bengal.

Overview
As per orders of the Delimitation Commission No. 218, Egra Assembly constituency is composed of the following: Egra municipality, Egra I community development blocks, and Basudevpur, Deshbandhu, Dubda, Manjusree, Paniparul, Sarbaday and Bibekananda gram panchayats of Egra II community development block.

Egra Assembly constituency is part of No. 34  Medinipur (Lok Sabha constituency). It was earlier part of Contai (Lok Sabha constituency).

Election results

2021

2016

2011

  

.# Swing calculated on Congress+Trinamool Congress vote percentages taken together in 2006. 2009 by election not taken into consideration because of lack of sufficient data.

2009 by election
The bypoll to the Serampore occurred due to resignation of the sitting MLA of AITC, Sisir Adhikari, who was elected to the Indian Parliament from Kanthi on 16 May 2009.

 

.# Swing calculated on Congress+Trinamool Congress vote percentages taken together, as well as the DSP vote percentage, in 2006. Data for comparison not available for the 2009 by-election.

2006

  

<small>.# Swing calculated on BJP+Trinamool Congress vote percentages taken together in 2006.

1977-2009
In the 2009 byelection, necessitated by the election of the sitting MLA Sisir Adhikari to Parliament from Kanthi (Lok Sabha constituency), Samaresh Das of Trinamool Congress defeated Prabodh Chandra Sinha.

In the 2006 state assembly elections, Sisir Adhikari of Trinamool Congress won the 213 Egra assembly seat defeating his nearest rival Prabodh Chandra Sinha of DSP (PC). Contests in most years were multi cornered but only winners and runners are being mentioned. Prabodh Chandra Sinha, contesting as Independent or on CPI(M) symbol, won the Egra seat between 1982 and 2001, defeating Tapan Kanti Kar of Trinamool Congress in 2001, Sohan Jyoti Maiti of Congress in 1996, Tapan Kanti Kar of Congress in 1991, Kshitindra Mohan Sahoo of Congress in 1987 and Khan Samsul Alam of Congress in 1982. Prabodh Chandra Sinha representing Janata Party defeated Anandi Nandan Das of CPI(M) in 1977.

1957-1972
Khan Samsul Alam of Congress won in 1972. Prabodh Chandra Sinha of PSP won in 1971. Bibhuti Pahari of PSP won in 1969 and 1967. Hrishikesh Chakraborty of Congress won in 1962. Bhuban Chandra Kar Mahapatra won in 1957.

References

Assembly constituencies of West Bengal
Politics of Purba Medinipur district